The 1969 Chicago Cubs season was the 98th season of the Chicago Cubs franchise, the 94th in the National League and the 54th at Wrigley Field. The season involved the Cubs gaining renown as "the most celebrated second-place team in the history of baseball." In the first season after the National League was split into two divisions, the Cubs finished with a record of 92–70, 8 games behind the New York Mets in the newly established National League East. Caustic 64-year-old Leo Durocher was the Cubs manager. The ill-fated season saw the Cubs in first place for 155 days, until mid-September when they lost 17 out of 25 games.

Offseason

The new National League 

With further expansion to the league, the 1969 season marked the first year of divisional play in Major League Baseball. The Atlanta Braves (along with the Cincinnati Reds) were placed in the NL West division, despite being located further east than the 2 westernmost teams in the NL East Division, the Cubs and St. Louis Cardinals. This was because the New York Mets wanted to be in the same division as the reigning power in the NL, which was the Cardinals at the time (to compensate for playing against the Dodgers and Giants fewer times each season). The Cubs consequently demanded to be in the NL East as well in order to continue playing in the same division as the Cardinals, one of the Cubs' biggest rivals. A side effect of this alignment is that it set the stage for what is considered one of the greatest pennant races – and comebacks in such a race – in MLB history.

Notable transactions 
 November 11, 1968: Dave Rosello was signed as an amateur free agent by the Cubs.
 January 15, 1969: Joe Campbell and Chuck Hartenstein were traded by the Cubs to the Pittsburgh Pirates for Manny Jiménez.
 March 28, 1969: Charley Smith was purchased by the Cubs from the San Francisco Giants.

Regular season

Season summary 
Hoping to improve on the previous year's 84–78 record, the Cubs began the 1969 season by winning 11 of their first 12 games, and on August 16, they were 75–44, up by a season high nine games over second place New York. By September 2, they had soared to an 84–52 record, well on pace to exceed the previous season's mark, but their lead over the Mets had fallen to five games. From there the Mets went on a tear. The Cubs ultimately lost 17 of the last 25 games of the season, while the Mets went 23–7 to overtake the Cubs and finish eight games ahead of them. It was one of the most astounding late season collapses in history, with the seventeen-game turnaround being one of the biggest ever. The Cubs finished 92–70, while the Mets won the National League East and would go on to win the World Series.

Summer of '69 
Throughout the summer of 1969, led by future Hall of Famers Ernie Banks, Ferguson Jenkins, Ron Santo, Billy Williams, and the game calling skills of Randy Hundley behind the plate, the Chicago Cubs had built a substantial lead in the newly created National League East. At the conclusion of each victory 3rd baseman Santo would jump and click his heels in celebration. After starting pitcher Ken Holtzman's no-hitter on August 19, the Cubs led the division by  games over the St. Louis Cardinals and  games over the New York Mets.

The Rise 
The 1969 season was bookended by a pair of homers that was memorable on one side and infamous on the other. On opening day at Wrigley Field on April 8, the Cubs trailed the Phillies 6–5 in the bottom of the 11th inning. With a runner on base, Willie Smith hit a game-winning home run into the right field bleachers. This event essentially "lit the fuse" to the Cubs' successful first five months of the season. They would win the next three games, and 11 out of their first 12, and create a cushion that would extend to  games in mid-August.

The Fall 
After the game of September 2, the Cubs' record was 84–52 with the Mets in second place at 77–55. But then a losing streak began just as a Mets winning streak was beginning. The Cubs lost the final game of a series at Cincinnati, then came home to play the resurgent Pittsburgh Pirates (who would finish in third place). After losing the first two games by scores of 9–2 and 13–4, the Cubs led going into the ninth inning in the series finale. A win would be a positive springboard since the Cubs were to play a crucial series with the Mets the very next day. But Willie Stargell drilled a 2-out, 2-strike pitch from the Cubs' ace reliever, Phil Regan, onto Sheffield Avenue to tie the score in the top of the ninth. The Cubs would lose 7–5 in extra innings. Meanwhile, the Mets had taken two of three against Philadelphia over the same weekend.

Burdened by a four-game losing streak, the Cubs traveled to Shea Stadium on September 8 for a short two-game set. The Mets won both games, and the Cubs left New York with a record of 84–58 just  game in front. Disaster followed in Philadelphia, as a 99-loss Phillies team nonetheless defeated the Cubs twice, to extend Chicago's losing streak to eight games. In a key play in the second game, on September 11, Cubs starter Dick Selma threw a surprise pickoff attempt to third baseman Ron Santo, who was nowhere near the bag or the ball. Selma's throwing error opened the gates to a Phillies rally.

After that second Philly loss, the Cubs were 84–60 and the Mets had pulled ahead at 85–57. The Mets would not look back. The Cubs' eight-game losing streak finally ended the next day in St. Louis, but the Mets were in the midst of a ten-game winning streak, and the Cubs, wilting from team fatigue, generally deteriorated in all phases of the game. The Mets (who had lost a record 120 games in their inaugural season 7 years earlier), would go on to win the World Series. The Cubs, despite a respectable 92–70 record, would be remembered for having lost a remarkable  games in the standings to the Mets in the last quarter of the season.

Bad luck 
Banks stated, however, that after an error by Young, Santo "went crazy. Young was so upset, he ran out ... I had never seen something so hurtful". According to Banks, "They say one apple can spoil the whole barrel, and I saw that", with the incident dividing the team into factions. The Book Baseball Hall of Shame 2 places the blame squarely (and perhaps unfairly) at the feet of one man, stating, "In the heat of battle, Leo Durocher, field general of the Cubs, went AWOL once too often. It was because of his lack of leadership that his team lost the fight for the 1969 pennant." Durocher did not believe in using the platoon system. He believed in putting his best eight players on the field every day. Five of the Cubs' regular players finished the season with over 150 games played. Two more had more than 130 games played. In his book, The Bill James Historical Baseball Abstract, baseball historian Bill James cited manager Durocher's method of using his regular players everyday without any rest days as a factor in the Cubs' collapse.

Overuse of the pitching staff may have played a part.  During the first 118 games (74–43 record on August 13), the Cubs averaged about 4.7 runs a game and gave up only 3.5 runs per game, a 1.2 run per game advantage over the opposition.  The last 45 games (18–27 record) saw a major reversal, with 3.7 runs per game for the team and 4.5 runs per game for the opposition (average Cub score would be a negative −0.8 runs per game versus opponents, almost a complete reversal from earlier play).  Both the hitters and pitchers may have wilted as the season wound down.

Perhaps most ominously, during one of the Cubs' games against the Mets, a black cat ran onto the field near Santo, and after the cat appeared, the Cubs' collapse began. This only fueled the myth of the Curse of the Billy Goat for many years afterwards.

Season standings

Record vs. opponents

Notable transactions 
 June 11, 1969: Adolfo Phillips and Jack Lamabe were traded by the Cubs to the Montreal Expos for Paul Popovich.

Draft picks 
 June 5, 1969: 1969 Major League Baseball draft
Jim Todd was drafted by the Cubs in the 10th round.
Pat Bourque was drafted by the Cubs in the 33rd round. Player signed June 9, 1969.

Roster

Game log 

|-  style="text-align:center; background:#bbffbb;"
|1||April 8|| Phillies||7 – 6 11||Regan (1–0)||Lersch (0–1)|| ||40,796||1–0
|-  style="text-align:center; background:#bbffbb;"
|2||April 9|| Phillies||11–3 ||Hands (1–0)||Wise (0–1)|| ||6,297||2–0
|-  style="text-align:center; background:#bbffbb;"
|3||April 10|| Phillies||6–2 ||Holtzman (1–0)||Fryman (0–1)|| ||5,422||3–0
|-  style="text-align:center; background:#bbffbb;"
|4||April 11|| Expos||1 – 0 12||Abernathy (1–0)||Sembera (0–1)|| ||7,281||4–0
|-  style="text-align:center; background:#ffbbbb;"
|5||April 12|| Expos||7–3 ||Grant (1–0)||Jenkins (0–1)||Sembera (2)||28,599||4–1
|-  style="text-align:center; background:#bbffbb;"
|6||April 13|| Expos||7–6 ||Regan (2–0)||Stoneman (0–2)|| ||27,664||5–1
|-  style="text-align:center; background:#bbffbb;"
|7||April 14|| Pirates||4–0 ||Holtzman (2–0)||Veale (1–1)|| ||3,114||6–1
|-  style="text-align:center; background:#bbffbb;"
|8||April 15|| Pirates||7–4 ||Aguirre (1–0)||Ellis (1–1)||Abernathy (1)||4,362||7–1
|-  style="text-align:center; background:#bbffbb;"
|9||April 16||@ Cardinals||1–0 ||Jenkins (1–1)||Carlton (1–1)|| ||16,418||8–1
|-  style="text-align:center; background:#bbffbb;"
|10||April 17||@ Cardinals||3–0 ||Hands (2–0)||Giusti (1–1)||Regan (1)||11,350||9–1
|-  style="text-align:center; background:#bbffbb;"
|11||April 19||@ Expos||6 – 5 11||Regan (3–0)||Shaw (1–2)|| ||16,005||10–1
|-  style="text-align:center; background:#bbffbb;"
|12||April 20||@ Expos||6–3 ||Jenkins (2–1)||Morton (0–1)|| ||N/A||11–1
|-  style="text-align:center; background:#ffbbbb;"
|13||April 20||@ Expos||4–2 ||Wegener (1–0)||J. Niekro (0–1)||McGinn (1)||28,025||11–2
|-  style="text-align:center; background:#ffbbbb;"
|14||April 22||@ Pirates||7–5 ||Hartenstein (1–0)||Hands (2–1)|| ||N/A||11–3
|-  style="text-align:center; background:#ffbbbb;"
|15||April 22||@ Pirates||6–5 ||Dal Canton (2–0)||Nye (0–1)||Kline (2)||7,906||11–4
|-  style="text-align:center; background:#ffbbbb;"
|16||April 24|| Cardinals||3–2 ||Giusti (2–1)||Holtzman (2–1)|| ||11,656||11–5
|-  style="text-align:center; background:#bbffbb;"
|17||April 25||@ Mets||3–1 ||Jenkins (3–1)||Seaver (1–2)|| ||18,548||12–5
|-  style="text-align:center; background:#bbffbb;"
|18||April 26||@ Mets||9–3 ||Hands (3–1)||Cardwell (0–3)|| ||16,252||13–5
|-  style="text-align:center; background:#bbffbb;"
|19||April 27||@ Mets||8–6 ||Regan (4–0)||Koonce (0–2)|| ||N/A||14–5
|-  style="text-align:center; background:#ffbbbb;"
|20||April 27||@ Mets||3–0 ||McGraw (2–0)||Nye (0–2)|| ||37,437||14–6
|-  style="text-align:center; background:#bbffbb;"
|21||April 28||@ Phillies||2 – 1 10||Abernathy (2–0)||Wise (2–2)|| ||4,438||15–6
|-  style="text-align:center; background:#bbffbb;"
|22||April 29||@ Phillies||10–0 ||Jenkins (4–1)||Jackson (2–2)|| ||3,811||16–6
|-  style="text-align:center; background:#ffbbbb;"
|23||April 30||@ Phillies||3–1 ||Fryman (3–1)||Hands (3–2)|| ||2,930||16–7
|-

|-  style="text-align:center; background:#bbffbb;"
|24||May 2|| Mets||6–4 ||Holtzman (3–1)||Gentry (2–1)||Regan (2)||14,702||17–7
|-  style="text-align:center; background:#bbffbb;"
|25||May 3|| Mets||3–2 ||Regan (5–0)||Koonce (0–3)||Abernathy (2)||23,228||18–7
|-  style="text-align:center; background:#ffbbbb;"
|26||May 4|| Mets||3–2 ||Seaver (3–2)||Hands (3–3)|| ||N/A||18–8
|-  style="text-align:center; background:#ffbbbb;"
|27||May 4|| Mets||3–2 ||McGraw (3–0)||Selma (2–3)|| ||40,484||18–9
|-  style="text-align:center; background:#bbffbb;"
|28||May 6|| Dodgers||7–1 ||Holtzman (4–1)||Sutton (3–3)|| ||7,253||19–9
|-  style="text-align:center; background:#ffbbbb;"
|29||May 7|| Dodgers||4 – 2 12||Brewer (1–1)||Jenkins (4–2)||McBean (2)||9,747||19–10
|-  style="text-align:center; background:#ffbbbb;"
|30||May 9|| Giants||11–1 ||Bolin (2–2)||Hands (3–4)||Gibbon (2)||5,189||19–11
|-  style="text-align:center; background:#bbffbb;"
|31||May 11|| Giants||8–0 ||Holtzman (5–1)||Sadecki (2–4)|| ||18,572||20–11
|-  style="text-align:center; background:#bbffbb;"
|32||May 12|| Padres||2–0 ||Jenkins (5–2)||Ross (1–2)|| ||3,887||21–11
|-  style="text-align:center; background:#bbffbb;"
|33||May 13|| Padres||19–0 ||Selma (3–3)||Kelley (2–3)|| ||5,080||22–11
|-  style="text-align:center; background:#bbffbb;"
|34||May 14|| Padres||3–2 ||Nottebart (1–0)||Podres (3–3)|| ||9,622||23–11
|-  style="text-align:center; background:#bbffbb;"
|35||May 16||@ Astros||11–0 ||Holtzman (6–1)||Dierker (5–4)|| ||17,053||24–11
|-  style="text-align:center; background:#ffbbbb;"
|36||May 17||@ Astros||5–4 ||Wilson (3–4)||Nottebart (1–1)||Gladding (5)||18,307||24–12
|-  style="text-align:center; background:#ffbbbb;"
|37||May 18||@ Astros||6–5 ||Ray (1–0)||Regan (5–1)||Gladding (6)||13,126||24–13
|-  style="text-align:center; background:#bbffbb;"
|38||May 20||@ Dodgers||7–0 ||Holtzman (7–1)||Sutton (4–4)|| ||21,266||25–13
|-  style="text-align:center; background:#ffbbbb;"
|39||May 21||@ Dodgers||3–1 ||Osteen (6–2)||Hands (3–5)|| ||16,688||25–14
|-  style="text-align:center; background:#bbffbb;"
|40||May 22||@ Dodgers||3–0 ||Jenkins (6–2)||Singer (5–4)|| ||17,974||26–14
|-  style="text-align:center; background:#bbffbb;"
|41||May 23||@ Padres||6–0 ||Selma (4–3)||Ross (1–4)|| ||7,936||27–14
|-  style="text-align:center; background:#bbffbb;"
|42||May 24||@ Padres||7–5 ||Abernathy (3–0)||Kelley (2–4)||Regan (3)||4,432||28–14
|-  style="text-align:center; background:#ffbbbb;"
|43||May 25||@ Padres||10–2 ||Podres (4–3)||Nye (0–3)|| ||N/A||28–15
|-  style="text-align:center; background:#bbffbb;"
|44||May 25||@ Padres||1–0 ||Abernathy (4–0)||J. Niekro (1–3)|| ||13,115||29–15
|-  style="text-align:center; background:#ffbbbb;"
|45||May 27||@ Giants||5–4 ||Linzy (2–1)||Regan (5–2)||Herbel (1)||6,608||29–16
|-  style="text-align:center; background:#bbffbb;"
|46||May 28||@ Giants||9–8 ||Holtzman (8–1)||Robertson (1–1)||Regan (4)||4,447||30–16
|-  style="text-align:center; background:#bbffbb;"
|47||May 30|| Braves||2–0 ||Hands (4–5)||Reed (5–3)|| ||36,075||31–16
|-  style="text-align:center; background:#bbffbb;"
|48||May 31|| Braves||3–2 ||Jenkins (7–2)||P. Niekro (7–4)|| ||29,778||32–16
|-

|-  style="text-align:center; background:#bbffbb;"
|49||June 1|| Braves||13–4 ||Selma (5–3)||Jarvis (5–3)|| ||24,349||33–16
|-  style="text-align:center; background:#bbffbb;"
|50||June 3|| Astros||4–2 ||Hands (5–5)||Lemaster (3–7)|| ||8,320||34–16
|-  style="text-align:center; background:#bbffbb;"
|51||June 4|| Astros||5–4 ||Jenkins (8–2)||Griffin (2–3)|| ||13,360||35–16
|-  style="text-align:center; background:#bbffbb;"
|52||June 6|| Reds||14–8 ||Holtzman (9–1)||Cloninger (3–7)||Regan (5)||22,185||36–16
|-  style="text-align:center; background:#ffc;"
|53||June 7|| Reds||5–5 || || || ||25,514||36–16
|-  style="text-align:center; background:#ffbbbb;"
|54||June 9|| Reds||4–1 ||Culver (4–4)||Jenkins (8–3)||Granger (6)||14,879||36–17
|-  style="text-align:center; background:#bbffbb;"
|55||June 10||@ Braves||3–1 ||Holtzman (10–1)||Reed (5–5)||Regan (6)||27,007||37–17
|-  style="text-align:center; background:#ffbbbb;"
|56||June 11||@ Braves||5–1 ||P. Niekro (10–4)||Hands (5–6)|| ||28,707||37–18
|-  style="text-align:center; background:#bbffbb;"
|57||June 12||@ Braves||12–6 ||Selma (6–3)||Hill (0–1)||Abernathy (3)||27,671||38–18
|-  style="text-align:center; background:#bbffbb;"
|58||June 13||@ Reds||14 – 8 10||Regan (6–2)||Pena (1–1)||Nye (1)||17,134||39–18
|-  style="text-align:center; background:#bbffbb;"
|59||June 14||@ Reds||9 – 8 10||Regan (7–2)||Granger (1–2)||Jenkins (1)||16,008||40–18
|-  style="text-align:center; background:#ffbbbb;"
|60||June 15||@ Reds||7–6 ||Carroll (8–3)||Regan (7–3)|| ||N/A||40–19
|-  style="text-align:center; background:#bbffbb;"
|61||June 15||@ Reds||5 – 4 *||Nye (1–3)||Arrigo (0–1)||Johnson (2)||26,511||41–19
|-  style="text-align:center; background:#ffbbbb;"
|62||June 16||@ Pirates||9–8 ||Dal Canton (4–0)||Regan (7–4)||Blass (1)||8,810||41–20
|-  style="text-align:center; background:#ffbbbb;"
|63||June 17||@ Pirates||1–0 ||Veale (4–7)||Jenkins (8–4)||Dal Canton (3)||N/A||41–21
|-  style="text-align:center; background:#ffbbbb;"
|64||June 17||@ Pirates||4–3 ||Blass (7–3)||Abernathy (4–1)|| ||26,817||41–22
|-  style="text-align:center; background:#ffbbbb;"
|65||June 18||@ Pirates||3 – 2 10||Gibbon (2–3)||Regan (7–5)|| ||12,198||41–23
|-  style="text-align:center; background:#bbffbb;"
|66||June 20|| Expos||2–0 ||Hands (6–6)||Robertson (1–4)|| ||18,890||42–23
|-  style="text-align:center; background:#ffbbbb;"
|67||June 21|| Expos||3–2 ||Reed (2–1)||Jenkins (8–5)||Shaw (1)||33,750||42–24
|-  style="text-align:center; background:#bbffbb;"
|68||June 22|| Expos||7–6 ||Selma (7–3)||Shaw (1–5)|| ||N/A||43–24
|-  style="text-align:center; background:#ffbbbb;"
|69||June 22|| Expos||5 – 4  6||Face (4–1)||Reynolds (0–1)||McGinn (2)||22,079||43–25
|-  style="text-align:center; background:#bbffbb;"
|70||June 23|| Pirates||5–4 ||Regan (8–5)||Dal Canton (5–1)|| ||12,500||44–25
|-  style="text-align:center; background:#bbffbb;"
|71||June 24|| Pirates||3–2 ||Hands (7–6)||Bunning (6–5)|| ||17,530||45–25
|-  style="text-align:center; background:#bbffbb;"
|72||June 25|| Pirates||5–2 ||Jenkins (9–5)||Veale (4–8)|| ||26,434||46–25
|-  style="text-align:center; background:#bbffbb;"
|73||June 26|| Pirates||7 – 5 10||Regan (9–5)||Dal Canton (5–2)|| ||29,473||47–25
|-  style="text-align:center; background:#ffbbbb;"
|74||June 27|| Cardinals||3–1 ||Carlton (8–5)||Holtzman (10–2)|| ||29,224||47–26
|-  style="text-align:center; background:#bbffbb;"
|75||June 28|| Cardinals||3–1 ||Hands (8–6)||Giusti (3–7)|| ||29,285||48–26
|-  style="text-align:center; background:#bbffbb;"
|76||June 29|| Cardinals||3–1 ||Jenkins (10–5)||Gibson (10–5)|| ||N/A||49–26
|-  style="text-align:center; background:#bbffbb;"
|77||June 29|| Cardinals||12–1 ||Selma (8–3)||Grant (4–8)|| ||41,060||50–26
|-  style="text-align:center; background:#ffbbbb;"
|78||June 30||@ Expos||5–2 ||Reed (3–1)||Lemonds (0–1)||McGinn (3)||12,508||50–27
|-

|-  style="text-align:center; background:#ffbbbb;"
|79||July 1||@ Expos||11–4 ||Renko (1–1)||Holtzman (10–3)||Face (4)||19,858||50–28
|-  style="text-align:center; background:#bbffbb;"
|80||July 2||@ Expos||4–2 ||Hands (9–6)||Stoneman (4–11)|| ||16,101||51–28
|-  style="text-align:center; background:#bbffbb;"
|81||July 3||@ Expos||8–4 ||Selma (9–3)||Wegener (3–6)||Regan (7)||12,194||52–28
|-  style="text-align:center; background:#bbffbb;"
|82||July 4||@ Cardinals||3 – 1 10||Jenkins (11–5)||Gibson (10–6)|| ||28,177||53–28
|-  style="text-align:center; background:#ffbbbb;"
|83||July 5||@ Cardinals||5–1 ||Briles (7–7)||Holtzman (10–4)|| ||35,767||53–29
|-  style="text-align:center; background:#ffbbbb;"
|84||July 6||@ Cardinals||4–2 ||Carlton (10–5)||Hands (9–7)||Hoerner (9)||N/A||53–30
|-  style="text-align:center; background:#ffbbbb;"
|85||July 6||@ Cardinals||6–3 ||Taylor (1–0)||Nye (1–4)|| ||48,294||53–31
|-  style="text-align:center; background:#ffbbbb;"
|86||July 8||@ Mets||4–3 ||Koosman (6–5)||Jenkins (11–6)|| ||37,278||53–32
|-  style="text-align:center; background:#ffbbbb;"
|87||July 9||@ Mets||4–0 ||Seaver (14–3)||Holtzman (10–5)|| ||50,709||53–33
|-  style="text-align:center; background:#bbffbb;"
|88||July 10||@ Mets||6–2 ||Hands (10–7)||Gentry (8–7)|| ||36,012||54–33
|-  style="text-align:center; background:#ffbbbb;"
|89||July 11|| Phillies||7–5 ||Boozer (1–0)||Abernathy (4–2)||Wilson (4)||24,509||54–34
|-  style="text-align:center; background:#bbffbb;"
|90||July 12|| Phillies||7–4 ||Jenkins (12–6)||Wise (6–7)||Regan (8)||26,732||55–34
|-  style="text-align:center; background:#bbffbb;"
|91||July 13|| Phillies||6–0 ||Holtzman (11–5)||Fryman (8–6)|| ||N/A||56–34
|-  style="text-align:center; background:#bbffbb;"
|92||July 13|| Phillies||6–4 ||Colborn (1–0)||Palmer (1–4)||Nye (2)||34,913||57–34
|-  style="text-align:center; background:#bbffbb;"
|93||July 14|| Mets||1–0 ||Hands (11–7)||Seaver (14–4)||Regan (9)||37,473||58–34
|-  style="text-align:center; background:#ffbbbb;"
|94||July 15|| Mets||5–4 ||Gentry (9–7)||Selma (9–4)||Taylor (8)||38,608||58–35
|-  style="text-align:center; background:#ffbbbb;"
|95||July 16|| Mets||9–5 ||Koonce (4–3)||Jenkins (12–7)||Taylor (9)||36,795||58–36
|-  style="text-align:center; background:#bbffbb;"
|96||July 18||@ Phillies||9–5 ||Regan (10–5)||Wilson (2–3)|| ||16,751||59–36
|-  style="text-align:center; background:#ffbbbb;"
|97||July 19||@ Phillies||5–3 ||Wise (7–8)||Hands (11–8)|| ||4,801||59–37
|-  style="text-align:center; background:#bbffbb;"
|98||July 20||@ Phillies||1–0 ||Jenkins (13–7)||Jackson (9–10)|| ||N/A||60–37
|-  style="text-align:center; background:#bbffbb;"
|99||July 20||@ Phillies||6–1 ||Selma (10–4)||Champion (3–5)|| ||12,393||61–37
|-  style="text-align:center; background:#bbffbb;"
|100||July 24|| Dodgers||5–3 ||Holtzman (12–5)||Sutton (12–10)||Regan (10)||26,476||62–37
|-  style="text-align:center; background:#ffbbbb;"
|101||July 25|| Dodgers||4–2 ||Osteen (13–8)||Jenkins (13–8)||Brewer (16)||20,844||62–38
|-  style="text-align:center; background:#bbffbb;"
|102||July 26|| Dodgers||3 – 2 11||Regan (11–5)||Brewer (3–4)|| ||29,172||63–38
|-  style="text-align:center; background:#ffbbbb;"
|103||July 27|| Dodgers||6–2 ||Drysdale (5–3)||Jenkins (13–9)||Mikkelsen (1)||30,291||63–39
|-  style="text-align:center; background:#bbffbb;"
|104||July 28|| Giants||4 – 3 10||Nye (2–4)||Marichal (13–6)|| ||9,439||64–39
|-  style="text-align:center; background:#ffbbbb;"
|105||July 29|| Giants||4–2 ||Linzy (9–6)||Abernathy (4–3)|| ||34,008||64–40
|-  style="text-align:center; background:#ffbbbb;"
|106||July 30|| Giants||6–3 ||Perry (13–7)||Nye (2–5)|| ||31,642||64–41
|-  style="text-align:center; background:#bbffbb;"
|107||July 31|| Giants||12–2 ||Jenkins (14–9)||Bolin (5–7)|| ||24,168||65–41
|-

|-  style="text-align:center; background:#bbffbb;"
|108||August 1|| Padres||5–2 ||Hands (12–8)||Kirby (3–14)||Regan (11)||16,921||66–41
|-  style="text-align:center; background:#bbffbb;"
|109||August 2|| Padres||4–1 ||Holtzman (13–5)||Santorini (4–10)|| ||26,984||67–41
|-  style="text-align:center; background:#bbffbb;"
|110||August 3|| Padres||4–3 ||Selma (11–4)||J. Niekro (6–8)||Regan (12)||32,566||68–41
|-  style="text-align:center; background:#bbffbb;"
|111||August 4||@ Astros||9–3 ||Jenkins (15–9)||Griffin (7–5)|| ||31,722||69–41
|-  style="text-align:center; background:#bbffbb;"
|112||August 5||@ Astros||5–2 ||Hands (13–8)||Lemaster (8–11)||Regan (13)||26,041||70–41
|-  style="text-align:center; background:#bbffbb;"
|113||August 6||@ Astros||5–4 ||Nye (3–5)||Billingham (4–6)||Selma (1)||29,449||71–41
|-  style="text-align:center; background:#ffbbbb;"
|114||August 8||@ Dodgers||5–0 ||Singer (14–7)||Jenkins (15–10)|| ||35,173||71–42
|-  style="text-align:center; background:#bbffbb;"
|115||August 9||@ Dodgers||4–0 ||Hands (14–8)||Foster (3–7)|| ||48,748||72–42
|-  style="text-align:center; background:#ffbbbb;"
|116||August 10||@ Dodgers||4–2 ||Sutton (14–11)||Holtzman (13–6)||Mikkelsen (2)||27,595||72–43
|-  style="text-align:center; background:#bbffbb;"
|117||August 12||@ Padres||4–0 ||Jenkins (16–10)||Santorini (4–12)|| ||9,794||73–43
|-  style="text-align:center; background:#bbffbb;"
|118||August 13||@ Padres||4–2 ||Hands (15–8)||J. Niekro (6–10)|| ||9,625||74–43
|-  style="text-align:center; background:#ffbbbb;"
|119||August 15||@ Giants||3–0 ||Marichal (14–8)||Holtzman (13–7)|| ||12,224||74–44
|-  style="text-align:center; background:#bbffbb;"
|120||August 16||@ Giants||3–0 ||Jenkins (17–10)||Perry (15–9)|| ||16,236||75–44
|-  style="text-align:center; background:#ffbbbb;"
|121||August 17||@ Giants||5–3 ||Linzy (10–6)||Hands (15–9)|| ||N/A||75–45
|-  style="text-align:center; background:#bbffbb;"
|122||August 17||@ Giants||3–1 ||Selma (12–4)||Bryant (2–1)||Regan (14)||25,586||76–45
|-  style="text-align:center; background:#bbffbb;"
|123||August 19|| Braves||3–0 ||Holtzman (14–7)||P. Niekro (16–11)|| ||37,514||77–45
|-  style="text-align:center; background:#ffbbbb;"
|124||August 20|| Braves||6–2 ||Reed (12–8)||Jenkins (17–11)|| ||34,709||77–46
|-  style="text-align:center; background:#ffbbbb;"
|125||August 21|| Braves||3–1 ||Britton (7–4)||Hands (15–10)|| ||29,866||77–47
|-  style="text-align:center; background:#ffbbbb;"
|126||August 22|| Astros||8–2 ||Dierker (16–9)||Selma (12–5)|| ||19,897||77–48
|-  style="text-align:center; background:#bbffbb;"
|127||August 23|| Astros||11–5 ||Holtzman (15–7)||Gladding (2–4)|| ||27,665||78–48
|-  style="text-align:center; background:#bbffbb;"
|128||August 24|| Astros||10–9 ||Regan (12–5)||Gladding (2–5)||Aguirre (1)||N/A||79–48
|-  style="text-align:center; background:#ffbbbb;"
|129||August 24|| Astros||3–2 ||Wilson (16–8)||Johnson (0–2)|| ||40,439||79–49
|-  style="text-align:center; background:#ffbbbb;"
|130||August 25|| Reds||9–8 ||Nolan (4–5)||Hands (15–11)||Ramos (2)||30,479||79–50
|-  style="text-align:center; background:#ffbbbb;"
|131||August 26|| Reds||8–7 ||Merritt (15–5)||Selma (12–6)||Granger (17)||31,473||79–51
|-  style="text-align:center; background:#ffbbbb;"
|132||August 27|| Reds||6–3 ||Cloninger (9–14)||Holtzman (15–8)||Carroll (7)||31,867||79–52
|-  style="text-align:center; background:#bbffbb;"
|133||August 28|| Reds||3–1 ||Jenkins (18–11)||Arrigo (2–6)|| ||29,092||80–52
|-  style="text-align:center; background:#bbffbb;"
|134||August 29||@ Braves||2–1 ||Hands (16–11)||Jarvis (10–9)|| ||36,413||81–52
|-  style="text-align:center; background:#bbffbb;"
|135||August 30||@ Braves||5–4 ||Johnson (1–2)||Reed (13–9)||Regan (15)||26,630||82–52
|-  style="text-align:center; background:#bbffbb;"
|136||August 31||@ Braves||8–4 ||Holtzman (16–8)||P. Niekro (18–12)||Regan (16)||33,142||83–52
|-

|-  style="text-align:center; background:#bbffbb;"
|137||September 2||@ Reds||8–2 ||Jenkins (19–11)||Cloninger (9–15)|| ||11,604||84–52
|-  style="text-align:center; background:#ffbbbb;"
|138||September 3||@ Reds||2–0 ||Maloney (8–4)||Hands (16–12)|| ||5,960||84–53
|-  style="text-align:center; background:#ffbbbb;"
|139||September 5|| Pirates||9–2 ||Blass (14–8)||Holtzman (16–9)|| ||10,411||84–54
|-  style="text-align:center; background:#ffbbbb;"
|140||September 6|| Pirates||13–4 ||Veale (11–11)||Jenkins (19–12)|| ||24,566||84–55
|-  style="text-align:center; background:#ffbbbb;"
|141||September 7|| Pirates||7 – 5 11||Dal Canton (8–2)||Johnson (1–3)|| ||28,698||84–56
|-  style="text-align:center; background:#ffbbbb;"
|142||September 8||@ Mets||3–2 ||Koosman (13–9)||Hands (16–13)|| ||43,274||84–57
|-  style="text-align:center; background:#ffbbbb;"
|143||September 9||@ Mets||7–1 ||Seaver (21–7)||Jenkins (19–13)|| ||51,448||84–58
|-  style="text-align:center; background:#ffbbbb;"
|144||September 10||@ Phillies||6–2 ||Wise (13–11)||Holtzman (16–10)|| ||4,164||84–59
|-  style="text-align:center; background:#ffbbbb;"
|145||September 11||@ Phillies||4–3 ||James (1–0)||Selma (12–7)||Jackson (1)||4,255||84–60
|-  style="text-align:center; background:#bbffbb;"
|146||September 12||@ Cardinals||5–1 ||Hands (17–13)||Taylor (7–3)|| ||31,717||85–60
|-  style="text-align:center; background:#ffbbbb;"
|147||September 13||@ Cardinals||7–4 ||Grant (8–11)||Jenkins (19–14)||Hoerner (15)||46,548||85–61
|-  style="text-align:center; background:#ffbbbb;"
|148||September 14||@ Cardinals||2 – 1 10||Gibson (18–11)||Holtzman (16–11)|| ||43,764||85–62
|-  style="text-align:center; background:#ffbbbb;"
|149||September 15||@ Expos||8–2 ||Wegener (5–12)||Selma (12–8)|| ||12,011||85–63
|-  style="text-align:center; background:#bbffbb;"
|150||September 16||@ Expos||5–4 ||Hands (18–13)||Robertson (5–14)||Regan (17)||5,216||86–63
|-  style="text-align:center; background:#bbffbb;"
|151||September 17|| Phillies||9–7 ||Jenkins (20–14)||Champion (5–10)||Nye (3)||6,062||87–63
|-  style="text-align:center; background:#ffbbbb;"
|152||September 18|| Phillies||5–3 ||Jackson (13–16)||Regan (12–6)|| ||5,796||87–64
|-  style="text-align:center; background:#bbffbb;"
|153||September 19|| Cardinals||2 – 1 10||Holtzman (17–11)||Gibson (18–12)|| ||N/A||88–64
|-  style="text-align:center; background:#ffbbbb;"
|154||September 19|| Cardinals||7–2 ||Torrez (9–4)||Selma (12–9)|| ||15,376||88–65
|-  style="text-align:center; background:#ffbbbb;"
|155||September 20|| Cardinals||4–1 ||Carlton (17–10)||Hands (18–14)||Grant (7)||28,194||88–66
|-  style="text-align:center; background:#bbffbb;"
|156||September 21|| Cardinals||4–3 ||Jenkins (21–14)||Taylor (7–5)|| ||28,287||89–66
|-  style="text-align:center; background:#ffbbbb;"
|157||September 23|| Expos||7–3 ||Stoneman (11–18)||Holtzman (17–12)|| ||3,047||89–67
|-  style="text-align:center; background:#bbffbb;"
|158||September 24|| Expos||6–3 ||Hands (19–14)||Renko (6–7)|| ||2,217||90–67
|-  style="text-align:center; background:#ffbbbb;"
|159||September 26||@ Pirates||2–0 ||Ellis (11–17)||Jenkins (21–15)|| ||4,973||90–68
|-  style="text-align:center; background:#ffbbbb;"
|160||September 27||@ Pirates||4–1 ||Blass (16–10)||Holtzman (17–13)||Moose (4)||4,157||90–69
|-  style="text-align:center; background:#bbffbb;"
|161||September 28||@ Pirates||3–1 ||Hands (20–14)||Veale (13–14)|| ||24,435||91–69
|-

|-  style="text-align:center; background:#ffbbbb;"
|162||October 1|| Mets||6 – 5 12||Taylor (9–4)||Selma (12–10)||Johnson (1)||10,136||91–70
|-  style="text-align:center; background:#bbffbb;"
|163||October 2|| Mets||5–3 ||Decker (1–0)||Cardwell (8–10)|| ||9,981||92–70
|-

|- style="text-align:center;"
| Legend:       = Win       = Loss       = Tie       = PostponementBold = Cubs team member

Player stats

Batting

Starters by position 
Note: Pos. = Position; G = Games played; AB = At bats; R = Runs; H = Hits; HR = Home runs; RBI = Runs batted in; Avg. = Batting average; SB = Stolen bases

Other batters 
Note: G = Games played; AB = At bats; H = Hits; Avg. = Batting average; HR = Home runs; RBI = Runs batted in

Pitching

Starting pitchers 
Note: G = Games pitched; IP = Innings pitched; W = Wins; L = Losses; ERA = Earned run average; SO = Strikeouts

Other pitchers 
Note: G = Games pitched; IP = Innings pitched; W = Wins; L = Losses; ERA = Earned run average; SO = Strikeouts

Relief pitchers 
Note: G = Games pitched; W = Wins; L = Losses; SV = Saves; ERA = Earned run average; SO = Strikeouts

Awards and honors

League leaders 
 Ferguson Jenkins – National League leader, strikeouts (273)

All-Stars 
All-Star Game
Don Kessinger, starting shortstop
Ron Santo, starting third baseman
Ernie Banks, reserve
Glenn Beckert, reserve
Randy Hundley, reserve

Farm system 

LEAGUE CHAMPIONS: Tacoma

Notes

References 

1969 Chicago Cubs at Baseball Reference
1969 Chicago Cubs on Baseball Almanac

External links 
 Miracle Collapse: The 1969 Chicago Cubs
 "Fans Still Carry the Torch for Also-Ran '69 Cubs", Baseball Digest, June 1993

Chicago Cubs seasons
Chicago Cubs season
Chicago Cubs